Marshall Dean is a Canadian politician and businessman. He represented the district of The Straits – White Bay North in the Newfoundland and Labrador House of Assembly, as a member of the Liberal Party. Dean won his seat in a by-election in October 2009, after the resignation of Cabinet Minister Trevor Taylor, but was not re-elected in the 2011 provincial election.

On March 30, 2010, Dean was ejected from the provincial legislature during question period for unparliamentary language. He used the unparliamentary language while accusing the Progressive Conservative government of punishing voters in his district for electing a Liberal MHA.

In March 2010, he criticized the government for moving air ambulance services from St. Anthony to Labrador.

In 2012 Dean's business, Canada Ice Enterprises, known for bottled iceberg water 80 Degrees North, declared bankruptcy.

Electoral record

|-

|Chris Mitchelmore
|align="right"|1,537
|align="right"|36.74%
|align="right"|+28.81
|-

|Marshall Dean
|align="right"|1,327
|align="right"|31.71%
|align="right"|-15.87
|-

|}

}

|Marshall Dean
|align="right"|1,925
|align="right"|47.58%
|align="right"|

|Dale Colbourne
|align="right"|321
|align="right"|7.93%
|align="right"|
|}

References

Liberal Party of Newfoundland and Labrador MHAs
Living people
People from St. Anthony, Newfoundland and Labrador
21st-century Canadian politicians
Year of birth missing (living people)